The Williamsport Millionaires were a minor league baseball team based in Williamsport, Pennsylvania from 1906 to 1910. Many teams in this era never adopted formal nicknames and neither did the Millionaires. The Millionaire name was used by newspaper writers of the era in reference to the high salaries that the Williamsport owners were able to pay to the members of the team.

 Location: Williamsport, Pennsylvania
 League: Tri-State League 1906–1910
 Affiliation: None
 Ballpark: various fields in Williamsport

References

Defunct minor league baseball teams
1906 establishments in Pennsylvania
Millionaires
1910 disestablishments in Pennsylvania
Baseball teams established in 1906
Sports clubs disestablished in 1910
Defunct baseball teams in Pennsylvania
Defunct Tri-State League teams
Baseball teams disestablished in 1910